Medway High School is a public high school in Medway, Massachusetts, United States.

High school 
The High School is the newest of the four schools in Medway.  The building was completed in 2003 and the school saw its first graduating class in 2005.  As of 2004 the high school had 771 students and 52 teachers, with a teacher:student ratio of 1:15. In 2008, approximately 217 10th grade students participated in the Massachusetts Comprehensive Assessment System exam.

Sports

The Medway Mustangs have a strong athletic program in general and have won a considerable amount (18) of State Championships in the past 30 years.  Medway has been a prominent soccer town for the past three decades. The Mustangs particularly dominated from the late 1980s to the late 1990s. Medway made it to the South State Finals 8 out of nine years from 1987 to 1995 and back again for another State Title in 1998 to go along with the 2 they already brought home in 1990 and 1993.
 
The most recent state championships have been Boys Soccer (2000), Girls Soccer (2001), and Girls Volleyball (2001 & 1999).

Medway is a member of the Tri Valley League (TVL), traditionally a competitive league made up of mainly Division II and III schools.  In 2012, the boys Ice Hockey team appeared in the State Finals at TD Garden. In 2008 the Mustangs won a Co-Share of the TVL for Football, which they shared with Norton High School.

Some other recent TVL tiles since 1995 include:
Ice Hockey TVL titles in 2007, 2006,  2017, 2019, & 2020
Girls Soccer TVL titles in 2006 & 2001.
Boys Soccer TVL titles in 2012, 2005, 2002, 2000, 1998 & 1995.
Boys Baseball TVL titles in 2002 and 2016.
Boys Basketball TVL title in 2017.
Girls Volleyball TVL titles in 2001, 2000 & 1999.

The 2001 Girls Volleyball team finished their season undefeated at 25–0.  They won an unbelievable 55 of 56 total sets played during that streak. They had also appeared in the state finals in 2000 and had won the state finals in 1999.

The Boys Baseball team enjoyed a historic season of their own in 2002, finishing 22-2 and easily capturing the TVL title with a regular season record of 19–1.  Seven of the nine players in the starting line-up were seniors.

Theatre 
The Medway High School musical is produced on a yearly basis.  Each year's show is typically cast in mid-to-late December, with rehearsals running from early January through mid March.  Show dates are usually the third full week in March.  Medway Cable Access generally records one of the nights of the production and the show is then aired on one of Medway Cable Access' Public-access television channels in the coming weeks and months.  Traditionally, the curtain goes up at 7:30PM.  Most performances last about two and a half hours, which includes one intermission.

The old Medway High School (current middle school) sat approximately 375 people.  The show schedule for this auditorium had a dress rehearsal/senior citizen show Tuesday morning, with public performances Wednesday, Thursday, Friday and Saturday evenings.  Bye Bye Birdie was the last production staged at the old Medway High School, with the final performance on March 20, 2004.

The new Medway High School auditorium seats approximately 575 people.  Because of the added seating, the production now performs four shows instead of five.  The new show schedule is Friday and Saturday nights, followed by a Sunday matinee. In 2018, The Little Mermaid was performed, and in March 2019, MHS presented Once on This Island.

References

Schools in Norfolk County, Massachusetts
Public high schools in Massachusetts
Medway, Massachusetts